Turpin is an unincorporated community in King William County, Virginia, United States.

References

Unincorporated communities in Virginia
Unincorporated communities in King William County, Virginia